The M26 is a motorway in Kent, England. It is a short link between the M25 at Sevenoaks and the M20 near West Malling, which provides connectivity between southern England and the Channel ports in Kent.

Route
The motorway starts at junction 3 of the M20 and heads west, encountering almost immediately the single junction along its length where it has an interchange with the A20. This junction is numbered 2a to reflect its proximity to the M20's nearby junction 2 (also connecting with the A20) a short distance to the north-west.

 to the west the M26 merges with the M25 at junction 5. There is no exit from the M26 at junction 5 and all traffic must join the clockwise (westbound) M25.

Anti-clockwise direction from the M25, the main carriageway continues directly on to the M26 at junction 5. To remain on the M25, traffic must turn on to the slip road which connects to the M25 spur coming north from Sevenoaks, which is multiplexed with the A21. The awkwardness of junction 5 is a result of the history of the two motorways' planning and construction.

History

Construction of the M26 began in 1977, although a route on a similar alignment was originally proposed in the Greater London Plan in 1944 as part of proposed post war improvements to London area transport network. Those proposals were developed further in the 1960s as part of the London Ringways plan and the route of the M26 at that time formed part of Ringway 4 and would have been designated as part of the M25.

Construction of the first part of the M25 began in 1972 but before it opened, plans for the London Orbital motorway were modified to combine the southern and western part of Ringway 4 with the northern and eastern part of Ringway 3. To connect the two separate routes, which together were numbered as the M25, an additional section of road needed to be planned and the M25 route was diverted northwards from junction 5 to meet Ringway 3 at Swanley (M25 junction 3).

The remaining section of Ringway 4 became the M26.  Until February 1986, the anticlockwise M25 simply became the M26 at Junction 5, as the M25 between Junction 5 and Junction 3 was not opened until then.

Proposed developments

New junction
Kent County Council has been in talks with the Highways Agency over a possible new junction with the A225, allowing direct access to Sevenoaks – or access to the A21 at the M25 junction.

Brexit contingency planning
Plans to modify the M26 to hold large numbers of lorries in the event of a no-deal Brexit were publicly revealed in October 2018.

Junctions

Data from driver location signs are used to provide carriageway identifier information.
{| class="wikitable"
|-  style="background:#0080d0; text-align:center; color:white; font-size:120%;"
| colspan=6 | M26 motorway junctions
|-
! miles
! km
! Westbound exits (B carriageway)
! Junction
! Eastbound exits (A carriageway)
! Coordinates
|-
|align = "center"| 0.0
|align = "center"| 0.0
|align="center"| Road continues as M25 (CW)Gatwick  (M23)Heathrow  (M4)Redhill (A25)
|align = "center"|  M25 J5
|align = "center"| Start of motorwayDartford Crossing, Stansted , Bromley (A21)M25(M11, M1)Sevenoaks, Hastings A21
| 
|-
|align="center"| 8.69.3
|align="center"| 13.915.0
|align="center"| Wrotham A20Sevenoaks (A25)Gravesend (A227)
|align = "center"|  J2a
|align = "center"|  Wrotham A20Paddock Wood B2016Gravesend (A227)
| 
|-
|align="center"|10.3
|align="center"|16.6
|align = "center"| Start of motorway
|align = "center"|  M20 J3
|align = "center"|  Road continues as M20 (E)Maidstone, Channel Tunnel, Dover M20
| 
|-
|colspan=6|Notes
Distances in kilometres and carriageway identifiers are obtained from driver location signs/location marker posts. Where a junction spans several hundred metres and the data is available, both the start and finish values for the junction are shown. 
Coordinate data from ACME Mapper.
|-

See also
 List of motorways in the United Kingdom

References

External links

CBRD Motorway Database – M26
The Motorway Archive – M26
Pathetic Motorways – M26

Motorways in England
Roads in Kent